Ingenious may refer to:
 Ingenious (board game) (2004) by Reiner Knizia
 Ingenious (2009 American film), a 2009 drama comedy romance film, originally titled Lightbulb, starring Dallas Roberts, Jeremy Renner, Ayelet Zurer
 Ingenious (2009 British film), a 2009 British television family drama starring Anna Bray, David Calder, Reece Douglas
 Ingenious Media, a division of London-based Ingenious Capital Management Limited, also known as Ingenious

See also 
 Ingenuity (disambiguation)